Suicide Prevention Hotline EP is an official extended play release from Alaska in Winter. It debuted 31 May 2011 through the band's Blogspot account, and a note published on its Facebook page. According to frontman Brandon Bethancourt, although the extended play is available merely on twenty micro-cassettes through his BigCartel page as an exclusive pre-release, the extended play will formally be released in "CD and mp3 form soon." The limited-edition micro-cassette format is designed for usage in telephone answering machines lest the "unanswered cries" from the extended play not be heard by listeners. Additionally, the limited-edition "pre-release" package includes a pill bottle, which contains a personal, but brief, message, written by Bethancourt himself.

Track listing
 "Forever Twenty-One Gun Salute (micro version)" 
 "Demons" 
 "Dancing With Death (micro version)" 
 "Divine Miscalculations"* 
 "Downward Spiral Dial Tone (micro version)"* 

 - On Side B (micro-cassette edition).

Personnel
Brandon Bethancourt - Vocals, Keyboards

References

2011 EPs
Alaska in Winter albums